The Workers' Communist Party (abbreviated APK) is a minor Danish communist party. It was founded in Copenhagen in April 2000.

The Founding Congress of the APK adopted the general programme, "The Manifesto for a Socialist Denmark", and the action program, "All Together against Capital", as well as the statutes of the APK.

The organizational principle of the APK is democratic centralism.

APK's historical roots lie in the antirevisionist Party-Building Communist Organization October (Oktober), which emerged from the Communist Party of Denmark (Marxist–Leninist) (DKP/ML) in 1997.

The central organ of the APK is the fortnightly Kommunistisk Politik (Communist Policy). Its theoretical journal is the publication Orientering (Orientations). Its international bulletin is the English-language Kommunistisk Politik International.

The youth organization of the APK is the Danish Communist Youth League (DKU).

The APK is an active member of the International Conference of Marxist–Leninist Parties and Organizations.

External links
Official APK site, partly in English
Kommunistisk Politik, APK's central organ

2000 establishments in Denmark
Anti-revisionist organizations
Communist parties in Denmark
Hoxhaist parties
International Conference of Marxist–Leninist Parties and Organizations (Unity & Struggle)
Political parties established in 2000